Albert Brayley (born 5 September 1981) is an English footballer who plays as a Striker for Basildon United. Brayley played in the Football League with Swindon Town in the 2001–02 season before dropping into non-League football.

Club career
Brayley began his footballing career as a youth player with West Ham United, where he was a member of their FA Youth Cup winning squad in 1999, scoring three goals in a 9–0 aggregate win over Coventry City. He signed professional forms in August 1999 but was released by the club without making any first team appearances.

Brayley joined Football League Second Division side Queens Park Rangers but after the club was relegated and went into administration, he was released along with 15 other players in May 2001, having made no appearances for the club. He joined Football League Second Division side Swindon Town in August 2001, where he made seven substitute appearances in the league and three in other competitions, in the 2001–02 season.

He left Swindon in August 2002 and after failing to impress on trial with Brentford, he dropped into non-league football, joining Canvey Island. Further moves include Hornchurch, Billericay Town, Heybridge Swifts, Farnborough Town, Thurrock, Aldershot Town, Grays Athletic, Margate in December 2005, Eastleigh in September 2006, Braintree Town in November 2006, Chelmsford City in summer 2007, Eastleigh for the second time in February 2009, Chelmsford City for the second time in March 2009, before joining fellow Conference South side Bishop's Stortford in late August 2009. He left the club in October, but returned for a second spell at Christmas time until February 2010. The remainder of the season he spent with Braintree Town. He then signed for Concord Rangers in the summer of 2010, and after being released from them he signed for Billericay Town in October 2010. In February 2011 he joined Harlow Town, Heybridge Swifts in August 2011, Thurrock in October 2011, Tooting & Mitcham United in December 2011, Harlow Town in March 2012, Bishop's Stortford again in August 2012, and East Thurrock United on dual registration in November 2012. In early 2013, he became the player-manager of non-league and hometown side Basildon United.

In July 2013 Brayley was offered a short-term contract at Chelmsford City, his third spell at the club.

On 27 March 2014, he made his debut for Great Wakering Rovers. Subsequently, he joined VCD Athletic on dual registration, making his debut for them on 12 April 2014.

He returned to Canvey Island in October 2016.

On 30 August 2019, Brayley joined Hullbridge Sports.

In September 2021, Brayley re-signed for Basildon United.

Managerial career

In 2013, Brayley was named as manager of his hometown club Basildon United whilst still playing for them. In August 2014, Brayley was appointed manager of Burnham Ramblers, again in a player-manager role, however he resigned from his post at Burnham Ramblers after the club were relegated from the Isthmian League Division One North in March 2015.

Representative honours

Honours
West Ham United
FA Youth Cup: 1999

Chelmsford City
Isthmian League: 2007–08
Essex Senior Cup: 2009

References

External links

Bertie Brayley 2002–03 stats at SoccerFactsUK
Bertie Brayley 2003–04 stats at SoccerFactsUK
Bertie Brayley 2004–05 stats at SoccerFactsUK
Bertie Brayley 2005–06 stats at SoccerFactsUK
Bertie Brayley 2006–07 stats at SoccerFactsUK

1981 births
Living people
West Ham United F.C. players
Queens Park Rangers F.C. players
Swindon Town F.C. players
Canvey Island F.C. players
Heybridge Swifts F.C. players
Hornchurch F.C. players
Braintree Town F.C. players
Billericay Town F.C. players
Farnborough F.C. players
Thurrock F.C. players
Aldershot Town F.C. players
Grays Athletic F.C. players
Margate F.C. players
Eastleigh F.C. players
Chelmsford City F.C. players
Bishop's Stortford F.C. players
Concord Rangers F.C. players
Tooting & Mitcham United F.C. players
Harlow Town F.C. players
East Thurrock United F.C. players
Basildon United F.C. players
Enfield Town F.C. players
Great Wakering Rovers F.C. players
VCD Athletic F.C. players
Burnham Ramblers F.C. players
Dorking Wanderers F.C. players
Hullbridge Sports F.C. players
English Football League players
National League (English football) players
Isthmian League players
Sportspeople from Basildon
English football managers
Burnham Ramblers F.C. managers
Association football midfielders
English footballers
Essex Senior Football League players